Frank Probasco Bohn (July 14, 1866 – June 1, 1944) was a politician from the U.S. state of Michigan. He served three terms in the United States House of Representatives from 1927 to 1933

Early life and education
Bohn was born in Charlottesville, Indiana, where he attended public high school. He attended Danville Normal College in Danville, Indiana, and graduated from the Medical College of Indiana, Indianapolis in 1890.

Political career
Bohn ran unsuccessfully as a Democrat for the Michigan House of Representatives from the Delta District in the Upper Peninsula of Michigan in 1896. He worked as a banker and was village president of Newberry, Michigan, 1904–1919, and a member of the Newberry School Board, 1908-1914.  He was an unsuccessful candidate in the Republican primary election for Lieutenant Governor of Michigan in 1916. He was a member of the Michigan Senate from the 30th District, 1923-1926.

Bohn defeated incumbent Republican Frank D. Scott in the primary election in 1926. He then won the general election to the United States House of Representatives from Michigan's 11th congressional district for the 70th Congress and the two succeeding Congresses, serving from March 4, 1927 to March 3, 1933.  He was an unsuccessful candidate for re-election to the 73rd Congress in 1932, losing in the general election to Democrat Prentiss M. Brown.

After leaving Congress, Bohn was a member of the Michigan State Hospital Commission from 1935 through 1937.  Bohn died at the age of seventy-seven in Newberry, Michigan and is interred there at Forest Home Cemetery .

References

The Political Graveyard

1866 births
1944 deaths
American bankers
Burials in Michigan
Michigan state senators
People from Hancock County, Indiana
Republican Party members of the United States House of Representatives from Michigan
Michigan Democrats
People from Newberry, Michigan
School board members in Michigan
20th-century American politicians